The 1968–69 Yugoslav Second League season was the 23rd season of the Second Federal League, the second level association football competition of SFR Yugoslavia, since its establishment in 1946. The league was contested in four regional groups (East, South, North and West Division), with 16 clubs each. There were from one to four teams relegated from each group at the end of the season.

East Division

Teams
A total of sixteen teams contested the league.

League table

South Division

Teams
A total of sixteen teams contested the league.

League table

North Division

Teams
A total of sixteen teams contested the league.

League table

West Division

Teams
A total of sixteen teams contested the league

League table

See also
1968–69 Yugoslav First League
1968–69 Yugoslav Cup

Yugoslav Second League seasons
Yugo
2